Neighbours is an Australian television soap opera that has aired since 18 March 1985. The series, its writers and directors have been nominated for a variety of different accolades, including 83 Logie Awards, 35 AWGIE Awards, over 200 Inside Soap Awards, 11 All About Soap Awards and 15 National Television Awards. The series has won 31 Logie Awards, making it the second most successful recipient behind fellow soap opera Home and Away.

Neighbours has an ensemble cast and several of its actors have received acting award nominations. Kylie Minogue has won four Logie Awards, while Ryan Moloney has won three Inside Soap Awards. Brooke Satchwell won a People's Choice Award in 1999 and Daniel O'Connor and Natalie Blair won King & Queen Of Teen at the 2007 Dolly Teen Choice Awards. Jackie Woodburne has been nominated for 25 awards, the most of any cast member. Neighbours has been nominated for over 500 awards and has won over 80.

All About Soap Awards
The All About Soap Awards are hosted by All About Soap magazine.

AACTA Awards
The Australian Academy of Cinema and Television Arts Awards, also known as the AACTA Awards, recognise excellence in the film and television industries, both locally and internationally. They were originally called the Australian Film Institute Awards (AFI Awards). In 2020, AACTA introduced the AACTA Audience Choice Awards following COVID-19 restrictions, which allowed viewers to vote on Australian screen and artist achievements locally and internationally across the last decade.

Australian Cosmopolitan Fun Fearless Female Of The Year Awards

Australian Directors' Guild Awards

Australian Writers Guild Awards
The AWGIE Awards are an annual awards ceremony hosted by the Australian Writers' Guild for excellence in television, stage and radio writing.

Digital Spy Reader Awards
The Digital Spy Soap Awards were created and hosted by entertainment website Digital Spy. The awards celebrate moments in British and Australian soap operas, and were first presented in 2008, where Neighbours was nominated in 13 of the 14 categories. From 2014, the awards became the annual Digital Spy Reader Awards, which polls readers for the best moments in various categories, including television soap operas, films, and tech.

Dolly Teen Choice Awards
The Dolly Teen Choice Awards are hosted by Dolly magazine.

Inside Soap Awards
The Inside Soap Awards are voted for by readers of Inside Soap magazine. The awards have been running since 1996.

Logie Awards
Neighbours is the second most successful recipient of Logie Awards, having won thirty-one Logies to date. Only Home and Away, has more awards with forty-seven. At the Logie Awards, Neighbours has won Most Popular Drama Series two times in 1987 and 1988, with a further nine nominations (2004, 2005, 2006, 2007, 2008, 2009, 2010, 2011 and 2019). 2019 also saw Neighbours nominated for Most Outstanding Drama Series, a category first for the  thirty-five year old series. The show was inducted into the Logie Hall of Fame in 2005. In 1988, Kylie Minogue became the youngest person, at nineteen, to be awarded a Gold Logie.

National Television Awards
The National Television Awards are a British television awards ceremony. The NTAs results are voted for by the general public and the award categories are given the title of Most Popular instead of Best.

Nickelodeon Australian Kids' Choice Awards
The Nickelodeon Australian Kids' Choice Awards is an annual awards show usually held during October or November. It is televised and the winners are chosen and voted for by children.

Penguin Awards
The Penguin Awards were introduced in the late 1950s by the Television Society of Australia to help promote "excellence within the industry".

People's Choice Awards

Rose d'Or Awards
The Rose d'Or is a television awards festival held in Switzerland. The awards focus on entertainment-based programmes.

Soap Extra Awards
The Soap Extra Awards are hosted by TV Week Soap Extra magazine.

TV Tonight Awards
The TV Tonight Awards are awarded by website TV Tonight.

TV Week and Soap Extra #OMGAwards

Other awards

Notes
 for "Most Outstanding Performance by an Ensemble in a Drama Series": Morgan Baker, Harley Bonner, Ashleigh Brewer, Josef Brown, Stefan Dennis, Rebekah Elmaloglou, Alan Fletcher, Kip Gamblin, Taylor Glockner, Saskia Hampele, Ariel Kaplan, Kate Kendall, Calen Mackenzie, Scott Major, Colette Mann, James Mason, Chris Milligan, Ryan Moloney, Eve Morey, Tom Oliver, Jenna Rosenow, Alin Sumarwata and Jackie Woodburne

 for "Most Outstanding Performance by an Ensemble in a Drama Series": Alan Fletcher, Jackie Woodburne, Scarlett Anderson, Harley Bonner, Josef Brown, Travis Burns, Stefan Dennis, Rebekah Elmaloglou, Kip Gamblin, Saskia Hampele, Ariel Kaplan, Kate Kendall, Calen Mackenzie, Colette Mann, James Mason, Scott McGregor, Chris Milligan, Ryan Moloney, Eve Morey, Tom Oliver, Morgana O'Reilly, Tim Phillipps, Jenna Rosenow, Olympia Valance and Meyne Wyatt

References

External links
 Neighbours awards at the IMDb

L
Lists of awards by television series